Conflict Catcher is a discontinued utility software application that was written by Jeff Robbin and published by Casady & Greene for classic Mac OS. It aided Macintosh users in solving conflicts between Mac OS that could occur on startup when a large amount of extensions and control panels were installed (see Extension conflict). Later versions of Conflict Catcher included a playable Asteroids game as an easter egg in the About menu. Conflict Catcher included a printed manual written by David Pogue.

A Mac OS X version was never released, since the extension mechanisms in Mac OS X does not have extension conflicts. The last version of Conflict Catcher was version 9, for Mac OS 9, sales were already declining and in 2003 Casady & Greene filed for bankruptcy. Conflict Catcher 9 was priced at $63, significantly higher than average prices for utility software.

References

Computer-related introductions in 1994
Classic Mac OS software